Sidney or Sydney James may refer to:

 Sid James (1913–1976), British-based South African actor and comedian
 Sidney James (footballer) (1891–1917), footballer for Huddersfield Town and Hartlepool United
 Sidney L. James (died 2004), journalist and editor
 Sydney James (priest) (1855–1934), Archdeacon of Dudley
 Syd James (Sydney Victor Austin James, 1895–1966), Australian rules footballer and cricketer
 Syd James (footballer, born 1898) (1898–1969), Australian rules footballer with Geelong
 Sydney Price James (1870–1946), British physician, parasitologist, and malariologist